Tan Jian (Chinese: 谭 建; born 20 January 1988 in Chengdu) is a Chinese female discus thrower.

Competition record

References

 

1988 births
Living people
Chinese female discus throwers
Athletes (track and field) at the 2012 Summer Olympics
Olympic athletes of China
Athletes (track and field) at the 2014 Asian Games
Sportspeople from Chengdu
World Athletics Championships athletes for China
Asian Games medalists in athletics (track and field)
Asian Games bronze medalists for China
Medalists at the 2014 Asian Games
21st-century Chinese women